There are many rivers named Bonito River or Rio Bonito.

Brazil
 16 rivers including:
 Bonito River (Alonzo River)
 Bonito River (Caceribu River)
 Bonito River (Canoinhas River)
 Bonito River (Correntes River)
 Bonito River (Goiás)
 Bonito River (Ivaí River)
 Bonito River (Macaé River)
 Bonito River (Rio das Flores)
 Bonito River (Timbó River)
 Bonito River (Tocantins)

Chile
 Bonito River (Chile)

Costa Rica
 Bonito River (Costa Rica)

Guatemala
 Bonito River (Guatemala)

Honduras
 3 rivers

Mexico
 Bonito River (Mexico)

Panama
 Bonito River (Panama)

United States
 Rio Bonito (New Mexico)

Venezuela
 2 rivers

See also
 Rio Bonito (disambiguation)
 Little River (disambiguation)